Selina Islam (also known as Selina Islam Papul) is a Bangladeshi politician and controversial business person. She is the incumbent Jatiya Sangsad member selected as an independent candidate from the reserved women's seat-49.

Early life
Islam was born in the Sonakanda village in Meghna Upazila of Comilla District to Mojibur Rahman and  Amina Begum. She is married to Mohammad Shahid Islam, the incumbent Jatiya Sangsad member representing the Lakshmipur-2 constituency.

Career
Islam is a Kuwaiti expatriate business person. She is the vice-president of Comilla north district of Bangladesh Awami League. She was elected as an independent candidate from the reserved women's seat-49 of the Eleventh Jatiya Sangsad. Shirin Sharmin Chaudhury administered the oath to her on 20 February 2019.

Controversy
On 26 December 2020, Islam was granted bail when she surrendered herself before a Dhaka court for a graft case filed earlier by the Anti-Corruption Commission. The court also ordered the authorities to freeze 670 bank accounts of Islam and three of her family members - her husband, Mohammad Shahid Islam; their daughter, Wafa Islam; and her sister, Jesmin Prodhan; in cases filed over corruption and money laundering. The ACC case stated that though Selina Islam's sister Jesmin Pradhan has no source of income, she had 44 accounts in different banks.

References

Living people
People from Comilla District
11th Jatiya Sangsad members
Women members of the Jatiya Sangsad
Independent politicians in Bangladesh
21st-century Bangladeshi women politicians
21st-century Bangladeshi politicians
1976 births